The 19th Lumières Awards ceremony, presented by the Académie des Lumières, was held on 20 January 2014, at the Espace Pierre Cardin in Paris. The ceremony was chaired by actress Carole Bouquet. Television journalist Estelle Martin and director Patrick Fabre were the hosts for the night. Blue Is the Warmest Colour won four awards including Best Film. Other winners included Me, Myself and Mum, The French Minister,  Venus in Fur, Grand Central, Horses of God and The Young and Prodigious T.S. Spivet.

Winners and nominees

Winners are listed first and highlighted in bold.

See also
 39th César Awards
 4th Magritte Awards

References

External links

 
 
 19th Lumières Awards at AlloCiné

Lumières Awards
Lumières
Lumières